José Dionisio Cisneros (1796–1847) was a soldier, bandit and guerrilla during the Venezuelan War of Independence.

1796 births
1847 deaths
Venezuelan military personnel
People of the Venezuelan War of Independence
Venezuelan revolutionaries
People from Miranda (state)
Executed Venezuelan people
Venezuelan guerrillas